Ben Rienstra (born 5 June 1990) is a Dutch professional footballer who plays as a midfielder for SC Cambuur. He formerly played for Heracles Almelo, Zwolle, AZ, Heerenveen, Willem II and Fortuna Sittard.

Personal life
His brother is professional football player Daan Rienstra.

Honours

Club
PEC Zwolle
Johan Cruyff Shield: 2014

References

External links
 Voetbal International profile 
 

1990 births
Sportspeople from Alkmaar
Footballers from North Holland
Living people
Association football midfielders
Dutch footballers
Netherlands youth international footballers
Heracles Almelo players
PEC Zwolle players
AZ Alkmaar players
Willem II (football club) players
SC Heerenveen players
Kayserispor footballers
Fortuna Sittard players
SC Cambuur players
Eredivisie players
Süper Lig players
Dutch expatriate footballers
Expatriate footballers in Turkey
Dutch expatriate sportspeople in Turkey